Secret Ponchos is an online multiplayer top-down shooter developed by Canadian indie studio Switchblade Monkeys. The game was released in Early Access in July 2014 for Windows and on December 2, 2014, for PlayStation 4. The game was released on PC as Most Wanted Edition in October 13, 2015, with more characters and maps. The PlayStation 4 version, has added these expansion packs.

Gameplay 

The game is set in the Wild West, where the player is an outlaw and fugitive. The primary focus is player versus player (PvP), where players duel online to gain reputation and notoriety. The game plays from a top-down perspective. The controls play like twin stick shooters.

Players who perform well receive a bounty on their heads, where they become the targets of players who want to receive the bounty's increased reputation reward. Other players can team up against the player with the bounty.

There are five maps, multiple game modes, and multiple characters. Every character has a dual-function weapon (e.g., a revolver that fires strong shots up close and rapid shots at a distance) and a secondary item, like dynamite.

The goal is to win the duels that can be 1v1 or 3v3 using better control and strategic use of the environment.

Development 

Switchblade Monkeys, an indie game developer, is a five-person team with seven extra contributors. Company president Yousef Mapara was formerly an art director at Radical Entertainment, and left to make his own iPhone game. Daunted by the realities of the iOS App Store competition, he didn't continue.

The game's name comes from the title of an internal production blog, which became popular with the developers. The team was inspired by Team Fortress, Street Fighter II, and League of Legends. The company was approached at PAX Prime by Sony representatives who played the game for 20 minutes, watched others play the game, and eventually introduced themselves to ask the developers to consider bringing the game to PlayStation 4. When the developers responded that they did not have the money, the representatives offered development kits and asked how they could reduce the company's barriers.

The team planned to implement cloth physics and ambient lighting between E3 2013 and release to take advantage of the PlayStation 4's advanced capabilities. Switchblade has also considered downloadable content such as new game modes and characters, including a capture point map that would function similar to that of League of Legends.

It was announced ahead of the 2013 PAX East convention and confirmed as a PlayStation 4-exclusive during Sony's E3 2013 press conference. It was released on PS4 on December 2, 2014, as was featured as part of PS Plus's December Free Game Collection.

The Windows version was officially announced before the 2014 PAX East convention and developer Caley Smyth told reporters the game will be released sometime in July 2014.

Reception 
IGN rated the game 7/10, with reviewer Mikel Reparaz.

References

External links
Steam Page

2014 video games
Indie video games
Shooter video games
Fighting games
PlayStation 4 games
PlayStation Network games
Video games developed in Canada
Windows games
Split-screen multiplayer games
Video games featuring female protagonists
Western (genre) video games